Goni is a town and comune in the province of South Sardinia, Sardinia, Italy

References

Cities and towns in Sardinia